Víctor Emanuel Díaz Palacios (born 22 November 1950) is a Mexican politician affiliated with the PRI. He currently serves as Deputy of the LXII Legislature of the Mexican Congress representing Puebla.

References

1950 births
Living people
People from Puebla (city)
Institutional Revolutionary Party politicians
21st-century Mexican politicians
Politicians from Puebla
Members of the Congress of Puebla
20th-century Mexican politicians
Deputies of the LXII Legislature of Mexico
Members of the Chamber of Deputies (Mexico) for Puebla